Frank Andrew Patrick (born March 11, 1947) is a former American football quarterback for the Green Bay Packers of the National Football League. He played three seasons for the Packers from 1970 to 1972. He attended Derry Area High School and the University of Nebraska. 

Patrick played all-state basketball as well as football at the University of Nebraska. In his sophomore year of college, Patrick passed for 1,449 yards, the most for a sophomore in the Big Eight and 13th in the nation. He set a single-game Big Eight record with 14 of 19 completions in Nebraska's October 1967 game against Kansas State. He played in the position of quarterback for only one year in college, switching to safety, and then to tight end during his senior year. Patrick was drafted as a tight end in the 1970s 10th round by the Packers, however they used him as a quarterback due to the strike. At 6'7", Patrick was the Packers' tallest ever quarterback.

On August 7, 1971, the Packers faced the Chicago Bears in a pre-season game in Milwaukee, Wisconsin. Playing quarterback for the Packers in the 3rd quarter and with the line of scrimmage near their own goal line, Patrick faded back to pass in his own end zone and, while trying to escape the Bears' pass rush, he accidentally stepped out of the end zone for a safety. The Bears won the game, 2–0.

After the NFL, Patrick opened a life insurance and casualty company in Lincoln, Nebraska.

References

External links
 Frank Patrick quarterback roots

1947 births
Living people
People from Westmoreland County, Pennsylvania
American football quarterbacks
Players of American football from Pennsylvania
Nebraska Cornhuskers football players
Green Bay Packers players